The 2018–19 Orenburg season was the club's first season back in the Russian Premier League, the highest tier of association football in Russia, following their relegation at the end of the 2016–17, and their second in their 42 year history.

Squad

Transfers

Summer

In:

Out:

Competitions

Russian Premier League

Results by round

Results

League table

Russian Cup

Squad statistics

Appearances and goals

|-
|colspan="14"|Players away from the club on loan:
|-
|colspan="14"|Players who left Orenburg during the season:
|}

Goal scorers

Disciplinary record

References

External links

FC Orenburg seasons
Orenburg